Arctic Springs is a neighborhood of Jeffersonville, Indiana, one mile east of downtown Jeffersonville, and directly across from Louisville's famed Water Tower. It was established as a resort area full of summer cottages. The Jeffersonville Elks Club ran a popular outdoor dance hall in the 1920s.

After its height as a resort area, it served as a water supply for the rest of Jeffersonville, as it had an aquifer from which wells could obtain water.

References
Kleber, John E.  Encyclopedia of Louisville. (University Press of Kentucky). pg.444.

Jeffersonville, Indiana
Geography of Clark County, Indiana
Neighborhoods in Indiana